Lazar Obradović (born 5 December 1992) is a Serbian footballer who plays as a left-back,

Career
Obradović joined FK Tuzla City in the summer 2018. At the end of 2018, he left the club by mutual consent. He later played for Borac Čačak.

References

External links
 
 Lazar Obradović stats at utakmica.rs 
 
 Lazar Obradović at Srbijafudbal

1992 births
Living people
Sportspeople from Čačak
Association football defenders
Serbian footballers
Serbian expatriate footballers
FK Borac Čačak players
FK Polet Ljubić players
FK Tuzla City players
Serbian First League players
Serbian SuperLiga players
Serbian expatriate sportspeople in Bosnia and Herzegovina
Expatriate footballers in Bosnia and Herzegovina